Daniel Thomas Trickett-Smith (born 8 September 1995) is an English footballer who plays as an attacking midfielder for  club Leek Town.

He was signed by Liverpool from Crewe Alexandra for a fee of £300,000 in 2012, and turned professional at the club the following year. He spent three years at Anfield without making a first-team appearance. He then spent two seasons with American United Soccer League side Sacramento Republic, before returning to England to join Leek Town in September 2017. He was signed by Port Vale in January 2019 and loaned back to Leek Town. He joined Curzon Ashton on loan in September 2019, to FC United of Manchester in February 2020 and again to Leek Town in October 2020. He featured in just three cup games during his two-and-a-half seasons at Vale Park before rejoining Leek Town in July 2021.

Club career

Liverpool
Trickett-Smith signed with Liverpool from Crewe Alexandra in the summer of 2012 for a fee of £300,000, with the potential to rise to £1 million. He initially did well for the "Reds", and was reported to be en route to manager Brendan Rodgers's first-team after he helped the youth-team to reach the semi-finals of the FA Youth Cup. He signed professional forms at Anfield in July 2013. However he then struggled with injuries and was released by new manager Jürgen Klopp after his contract expired in summer 2016.

Sacramento Republic
On 19 May 2016, Trickett-Smith signed with American United Soccer League side Sacramento Republic; head coach Paul Buckle said that "I have seen him train and he is a very, very talented player". He made his competitive debut ten days later in a 1–1 draw with Swope Park Rangers at Bonney Field. He scored his first goal for the "Quails" in a 6–2 victory over Rio Grande Valley on 22 June. This was his only goal in nine competitive appearances during the 2016 season. He featured 14 times in the 2017 season, scoring two goals. He was released by mutual consent on 18 August 2017.

Leek Town
Upon his return to England in September 2017, Trickett-Smith signed for Northern Premier League Division One South side Leek Town, who were managed by former Crewe coach Neil Baker. He made his debut on 16 September, coming on as a 76th-minute substitute for Niall Maguire in a 0–0 with Spalding United at Harrison Park. He scored his first goals for the "Blues" ten days later, securing a brace in a 3–0 victory over Sheffield. He ended the 2017–18 season with 13 goals in 38 league and cup appearances. He opened the 2018–19 season with a brace in a 4–0 win at Skelmersdale United. He went on to score a hat-trick in a 4–1 New Years Day win over Newcastle Town.

Port Vale
On 31 January 2019, Trickett-Smith joined EFL League Two side Port Vale on a deal to run until summer 2021, before being loaned back to Leek Town for the rest of the season. He was named on the Northern Premier League West Division team of the season for the 2018–19 campaign, alongside Leek teammate Danny Roberts. Leek reached the play-off final after finishing third in the league, but were beaten 2–1 by Radcliffe to miss out on promotion.

Speaking in July 2019, manager John Askey said that he would look to loan Trickett-Smith to a higher-level club than Leek Town. On 13 September, Trickett-Smith joined National League North side Curzon Ashton on a two-month loan. He made a brief cameo for the "Nash" the following day, before scoring a long-range strike on his full debut on 28 September, in a 2–1 defeat at Farsley Celtic. During this loan spell he also made his debut for the "Valiants" in a 2–1 victory over Newcastle United U21 in an EFL Trophy group stage game at Vale Park on 11 November. On 21 February 2020, he went out on loan to Northern Premier League Premier Division side FC United of Manchester.

On 13 October 2020, Trickett-Smith returned to former club Leek Town on loan for the first half of the 2020–21 season. He scored three goals in five games before the Northern Premier League was suspended due to restrictions put in place because of the COVID-19 pandemic in England. He was not registered in the EFL squad for Port Vale during the second half of the 2020–21 season and was released by new manager Darrell Clarke in May 2021.

Return to Leek Town
Trickett-Smith returned to Leek Town on a permanent basis after his release from Port Vale. He scored 19 goals in 38 appearances throughout the 2021–22 campaign. He was the joint-third highest goalscorer in the Northern Premier League
Division One West, but could not prevent Leek losing 4–1 to Runcorn Linnets in the play-off semi-finals.

International career
Trickett-Smith made three appearances for England under 16s.

Career statistics

Honours
Individual
Northern Premier League West Division team of the season: 2018–19

References

Living people
1995 births
Sportspeople from Newcastle-under-Lyme
English footballers
England youth international footballers
Association football midfielders
Association football forwards
Crewe Alexandra F.C. players
Liverpool F.C. players
English expatriate footballers
Sacramento Republic FC players
Leek Town F.C. players
Port Vale F.C. players
Curzon Ashton F.C. players
F.C. United of Manchester players
USL Championship players
Northern Premier League players
National League (English football) players
Expatriate soccer players in the United States
English expatriate sportspeople in the United States